, sometimes styled as Tôkyô Dogs, is a Fuji TV Japanese television drama, which stars Shun Oguri, Hiro Mizushima and Yuriko Yoshitaka.

Synopsis
So Takakura (Oguri) witnessed his father's murder at a young age. Pledging to catch the killer, he grows up to become an elite cop in New York City, where the criminal lives. His character is cool-headed and disciplined, yet adapts well. Because of major drug dealings, he gets sent to Tokyo to conduct a joint investigation with the Japanese police. There, he gets teamed up with Maruo Kudo (Mizushima), a detective from a special investigative division. Kudo is a hot-blooded fighting expert due to his earlier days as a delinquent, but he makes a strong impression with his stylish appearance and is always interested in going on group dates. His personality, interests, and investigation methods are completely mismatched with Takakura's, but the two somehow work together to crack the case they have been given. With the appearance of a woman who apparently lost all her memories yet seemed to be greatly linked to the murderer of Takakura's father, the story of the worst, yet the best, partnership between the New York elite and the Japanese detective begins...

Cast
 Shun Oguri as So Takakura 
 Hiro Mizushima as Maruo Kudo
 Yuriko Yoshitaka as Yuki Matsunaga
 Ryo Katsuji as Keiichi Horikawa
 Mikihisa Azuma as Mashiko Reiji
 Kotaro Shiga as Mitsuo Suzuki
 Asami Usuda as Maki Tanaka
 Rie Tomosaka as Yuri Nishioka
 Kensei Mikami as Hiroto Kaizaki
 Hiroshi Yazaki as Shigeo Kamata
 Haruna Kawaguchi as Karin Takakura
 Takuya Yoshimura as Shota Nakatani
 Yoshiko Tanaka as Kyoko Takakura
 Nene Otsuka as Misa Maijima
 Tomokazu Miura as Kozo Otomo
 Takeru Shibuya as So Young
 Manami Bunya as Yuki Young

References

2009 Japanese television series debuts
2009 Japanese television series endings
Japanese drama television series
Fuji TV dramas
Television shows written by Yûichi Fukuda